Dominik Sandal (born 31 July 1997) is a Slovak football forward who currently plays for Pohronie in the 2. Liga.

Club career

FK Pohronie
Sandal joined Pohronie's first team during the winter preparation of 2021–22. Sandal was compared to his former teammates from DAC Dunajská Streda youth teams Alex Iván and Kristóf Domonkos in his potential, despite arriving from Nemzeti Bajnokság III.

Sandal made his Fortuna Liga debut in the third matchday of Relegation Group during a home fixture against season's novices of Tatran Liptovský Mikuláš on 19 March 2022. Sandal came on as a substitute replacing a former Slovak international Jaroslav Mihalík in the 87th minute. The final score had previously already been set, following two first-half goals by Christián Steinhübel and Dragan Andrić.

Prior to that, Sandal had booked two appearances in two March Slovak Cup fixtures, appearing in the second half of a 1-2 victory over Vranov nad Topľou, when he replaced David Bangala, and also appearing in last minutes of a 2-3 defeat and competition knock-out versus Senica.

Sandal first appeared in the starting line-up for Pohronie in the final match of the season, when the Žiar nad Hronom-based club was certain to be relegated, after three years in the top league. In this match, on 21 May 2022, Sandal completed the entirety of the match, which saw Pohronie defeat Senica 1-0 thanks to a goal by season's top scorer Miloš Lačný, with Záhoráci fielding mostly youth team players, due to financial collapse and mass resignations of the first team in previous weeks.

Seven days earlier, Sandal scored his first goal for Pohronie during a 1–3 victory over ViOn Zlaté Moravce at ViOn Aréna. Sandal came on after 62 minutes to replace Filip Hašek with the score tied at 1–1, following first half goals by ViOn's Jozef Menich and an equaliser through Martin Tóth's own goal. While on pitch, Sandal witness Pohronie take the lead through Martin Klabník's header in 69th minute and he finalised the score three minutes later, utilising a pass by David Bangala. This match was a debut for former national team manager Ján Kocian with ViOn.

References

External links
 
 
 Futbalnet profile 
 

1997 births
Living people
Sportspeople from Dunajská Streda
Slovak footballers
Association football midfielders
FC DAC 1904 Dunajská Streda players
Gyirmót FC Győr players
Pápai PFC players
FK Pohronie players
3. Liga (Slovakia) players
Nemzeti Bajnokság II players
Nemzeti Bajnokság III players
Slovak Super Liga players
2. Liga (Slovakia) players
Expatriate footballers in Hungary
Slovak expatriate sportspeople in Hungary